Lemolo Lake (ləmolo--Chinook Jargon for "wild" or "untamed") is a small lake and reservoir in Douglas County, Oregon in the Umpqua National Forest  north of Crater Lake National Park, on the North Umpqua River. It is part of the Diamond Lake Ranger district and is administered by the United States Forest Service.

History
Before the 1880s, the area around Lemolo Lake was used mainly by the Native American groups. It was not until the 1880s that white settlers began to use the area extensively as grazing land for sheep. The first land-use reform came in 1908 when the McGowan, Kelsay Valley, and Dog Prairie Allotments allowed for regulated grazing in the areas around Lemolo and Diamond Lakes.  While development continued in the vicinity of Diamond Lake throughout the 20th century, the land around Lemolo Lake remained relatively untouched with the exception of the building of the North Umpqua road in 1939 (later replaced by Hwy. 138 in 1964), the installation of telephone lines between 1909 and 1965, the construction of the two Lemolo dams from 1952–1956, and periodic timber harvesting or replanting from the 1950s through the 1990s. Cabins and the only store were built at Lemolo Lake between 1963 and 1984.

The reservoir was formed by the construction of two hydroelectric dams, Lemolo #1 ( high, completed in 1955) and Lemolo #2 Forebay ( high, dating from 1956).  Together they generated 65 megawatts.  Both are part of the larger North Umpqua Hydroelectric Project, located entirely within the Umpqua National Forest, and owned and operated by PacifiCorp.

Location and geography

It forms the tip of a triangle of lakes formed by Lemolo Lake to the north, Diamond Lake to the south, and Miller Lake to the southeast. Unlike nearby Diamond Lake, Lemolo Lake is isolated and serviced only by National Forest Development Roads. There are excellent views of Mt. Bailey and Mt. Thielsen, as well as Cinnamon Butte (all of which are located to the south of Lemolo Lake).

Recreation

Summer 
The lake is a popular camping and fishing spot during the summer months and boasts four forest service campgrounds and Lemolo Lake KOA which has RV and Tent sites and 7 full service cabins. The most popular activities during the summer include fishing for trout, swimming, hiking and water skiing. Personal watercraft are also allowed on the lake, however the marina does not offer speed-boats or jet-skis, so water skiers must provide their own.

Health notices
During the summer months, there can be blue-green algae blooms, which may be harmful to health. These blooms do not occur every year, nor do they occur at the same time of year. Visitors should check with the USFS for advisory warnings about water conditions before making the trip. Efforts have succeeded in recent years to curb the algae growth in Lemolo Lake and nearby Diamond Lake. These efforts have coincided with the removal of invasive fish species such as the Tui Chub. In 2009, the algae level was 300,000 cells per millimeter, down from the millions of cells measured in prior years.

Winter 
 Lemolo Lake's cabins and camping areas are open from late April-Mid Octorber.

See also
 List of lakes in Oregon

References 

Reservoirs in Oregon
Protected areas of Douglas County, Oregon
Umpqua National Forest
Dams in Oregon
PacifiCorp dams
Dams completed in 1955
1955 establishments in Oregon
Lakes of Douglas County, Oregon